Sathyan is a common Indian name and can refer to:

 Sathyan (actor) (1912–1971), Manuel Sathyaneshan , Malayalam film actor
 Sathyan (Tamil actor) (born 1975), Tamil film comedian and actor
 Sathyan (singer) (born 1980), Sathyan Mahalingam, an Indian playback singer and composer